Hydroxypivaldehyde is the organic compound with the formula HOCH2(CH3)2CCHO.  A colorless liquid, it is produced by condensation of formaldehyde and isobutyraldehyde:

CH2O  +  (CH3)2CHCHO  →  HOCH2(CH3)2CCHO
The compound is a rare example of a distillable aldol (3-hydroxyaldehyde).  Upon standing, it dimerizes reversibly to the dioxane derivative.  Its main use, in terms of scale, is as a precursor to neopentyl glycol:
HOCH2(CH3)2CCHO  +  H2  →  (CH3)2C(CH2OH)2
It is also used in the industrial synthesis of vitamin B5.

References

Alkanals
Alcohols